Clifton Springs Sanitarium Historic District is a national historic district located at the Village of Clifton Springs in Ontario County, New York. The district includes the previously listed main Clifton Springs Sanitarium and Foster Cottage.  The expansion includes all the surrounding structures directly associated with the sanitarium during the historic period and the remaining intact portion of the original landscaped grounds.  The additional structures include the Foster Block (1865, with 1899 and 1920 additions); the YMCA (1879), the current sanitarium (1896), Maxwell Hall (1926), and the Woodbury Building with connecting pavilion (1927).

It was listed on the National Register of Historic Places in 1990.

Gallery

References

External links

Spa Apartments - Around Clifton Springs
The Foster Cottage Museum

Historic districts on the National Register of Historic Places in New York (state)
Gothic Revival architecture in New York (state)
Neoclassical architecture in New York (state)
Historic districts in Ontario County, New York
National Register of Historic Places in Ontario County, New York